Studies in Christian Ethics is a quarterly peer-reviewed academic journal that covers  Christian ethics  and moral theology. The editor-in-chief is Susan Frank Parsons. It was established in 1988 and is currently published by SAGE Publications on behalf of the Society for the Study of Christian Ethics.

Abstracting and indexing 
Studies in Christian Ethics is abstracted and indexed in:
 Index theologicus
 International Bibliography of Periodical Literature
 Religion & Philosophy Collection
 Scopus

External links 
 
 Society for the Study of Christian Ethics

SAGE Publishing academic journals
English-language journals
Ethics journals
Christianity studies journals
Publications established in 1988
Quarterly journals